Tarakote formerly Shergarh-Tarakote Estate was a quasi princely state in Korei, Odisha which was established under the Mughal Empire as a Sarakaar and was later reduced to an intermediary princely estate during the subsequent Maratha and the British rule. Its capital was at Tarakote, in the western part of the present day Korei block.
 
The state was bounded in the north by Baitarani River, Labanga hill in the west, Madala hill in the east and by the Brahmani river in the south.

History

Mughal period
 
Shergarh State was established in 1632 by the Mughal general Syed Baqar Habibullah Ali Mirza. During the 1630s, the Mughal rule in Odisha was de-stabilized due to the rebellions of the Afghans and the local gadjat kings. Under the order of Emperor Shahjahan himself, a military general of Nadia named Syed Baqar Habibullah Ali Mirza was sent to the Mughal cantonment at Jajanagar (established by Man Singh) to aid the then Mughal Subedar of Odisha, Shehzada Shah Shuja (the son of Emperor Shahab-ud-din Muhammad Khurram Shahjahan). 
 
Habibullah had a brother named Syed Inayatullah Ali Mirza, who was a Qazi (jurist) by profession, he came to Odisha along with his brother. Having successfully crushed the local rebellions, both the brothers returned to the Korei cantonment. It was during this time that the neighbouring tribal kingdom of Sabaragada refused to submit their territories and accept the Mughal suzerainty, they also killed the Safeer (Rajdoot, messenger of the Subedaar). Baqar marched towards Sabaragada (lying in the northwest part of today's Jajpur district), with his army. 
 
Sabaragada was ruled by the Sabara tribe and hence it got its name from it Sabara (the tribe) and gada (meaning fort) hence it literally meant the 'fort of the Sabaras'. Baqar surrounded the fort from all sides and seized the fort. Having no other option the Sabara chieftain, Bangara Gunua submitted to Baqar Ali Mirza and accepted the Mughal suzerainty and the overlordship of the King Emperor. 
Baqar changed the name of Sabaragada to Shergarh, symbolising the Mughal imperialism and dominance in the area. However to honor the tribal leader, he built a new fort over the ruins of Sabaragada fort and named it after him Bangar-e-kot (kot, in Persian meaning fort) [present day : Bangarkote]. 
 
Baqar then built four other forts in Shergarh, namely Uttarkot (towards the north of Shergarh), Paschimkot (present day: Pacchikote, towards the west of Shergarh), Purabkot (towards the east of Shergarh) and finally Tarakote (at the centre of Shergarh). During the reign of Shahjahan, Orissa was reorganised into 12 Sarkars and 276 Mahals in places of 3 Sarkars and 62 original Parganas. This reorganisation took place in 1692 A.D., after Orissa being separated from Bengal constituted a separate Subah under the Imperial Mughal Empire. Habibullah Baqar's newly made Shergarh formed a new Sarkar/Dandapada and gained recognition of the Emperor as Choti Jajpur Sarkar. It had 5 Mahals under it, namely Purbakot, Uttarkot, Tarakote, Pacchikote and Bangarkote. A total sum of Rs 1, 27, 208 was assessed from these five Mahals.
 
In that very year, Habibullah Baqar was duly recognized as the Shiqdaar-e-Sarkaar and later as the ruler of Shergarh, Raja Miyan (under the suzerainty of the Emperor) by the newly made Subedar of Odisha, Mutaqad Khan Mirza Makki. Habibullah hence assumed the title of Meherbaan Raja Miyan and made Tarakote his capital and appointed his brother Syed Inayatullah Ali Mirza as the Shahi Qazi of Shergarh.

Under Maratha rule
 
The rulers of Shergarh became more autonomous, when the Mughal rule in Odisha weakened and Odisha fell under the control of the Nawabs of Bengal. They successfully resisted many attacks of the Bargis during the Maratha invasions of Bengal and Orissa. However, after Odisha was handed over to the Marathas by Alivardi Khan in 1751, Shergarh's territories got eroded away gradually. By the second half of the eighteenth century, more than half of Shergarh had been ceded to the Marathas, who reduced it to an intermediary Quasi Princely Zamindari state. In 1767 the Marathas occupied Pacchikote fort and installed a new ruler in the domain, confining the rulers of Shergarh to their capital at Tarakote. Shergarh then was only left with Bansipur, Gourpur, Icchapur,
Jaintria, Jugala, Jugalakana, Khosalpur, Kundapur, Nayahat Patna, Sahaspur, Talia, Tulasipur, Bangarkote, Barundai, Biruanapada, Khajuribindha, Khajurinaula, Santsahi, Tarapada, Uttarakhajira, Uttarkot, Godarapal, Kadamba Paramanandpur and Pataranga

Under British rule
 
After the British occupation of Odisha on December 17, 1803, Tarakote along with the other subsidiary Maratha zamindari states in Odisha fell under the company's rule. Shergarh was recognised as a British protectorate in 1807 following the defeat of the Maratha Empire in the area. But its remaining territories were confiscated and annexed by the British in 1821, when Raja Miyan Nuruddin Ali failed to pay the exorbitant taxes to the British. 
In 1886 Raja Syed Irfan Ali built the first girls school in Jajpur district, which is presently known as Tarakot Urdu girls Makhtab school. Later in the 1920s the largest source of revenue of Raja Syed Irfan Ali Choudhury, the "haat" or the local bazaar was also sold off by the British. With the abolition of the Zamindari system in India in 1956, Shergarh-Tarakote state was formally abolished.

Rulers
 
The rulers of Shergarh state were Sunni Muslims of the Sayyid branch who held the title of Raja Miyan until 1892.

Sarkaardaars of Shergarh
 
 1683–1702 :  Raja Miyan Syed Baqar Habibullah Ali Mirja 
 1703–1747 : Raja Miyan Syed Ruknuddin Ali Mirja
 1747–1750 : Raja Miyan Syed  Hassan Ali Mirja
 1750–1788 : Raja Miyan Syed Zulfiqar Haroon Ali
 1788–1804 : Raja Miyan Syed Abdul Ali

Rajas of Tarakote
 
 1804–1869 : Raja Miyan Syed Nuruddin Ali Choudhury
 21 Jan 1869– 11 July 1890 : Raja Syed Irfan Ali Choudhury
 1890-1892 : Noor-un Nissa Bibi Badi Begum Saheb 
 1892–1956 : Mohammed Dabiruddin

Titular rulers
 11 March 1970 - 10 July 1999 : Mohammed Mozzamil Hussain 
 20 August 1999 – 28 January 2023 : Fazal e Haq Mohammed Hussain Rabi Gandhi

References